The first government of José Antonio Griñán was formed on 24 April 2009 following the latter's election as President of Andalusia by the Parliament of Andalusia on 22 April and his swearing-in on 23 April, as a result of the resignation of the former president, Manuel Chaves, upon his nomination as Third Deputy Prime Minister in the second government of José Luis Rodríguez Zapatero.

The cabinet comprised members of the PSOE–A and one independent. It was automatically dismissed on 26 March 2012 as a consequence of the 2012 regional election, but remained in acting capacity until the next government was sworn in.

Investiture

Council of Government
The Council of Government was structured into the office for the president and 15 ministries. From March 2010, the number of ministries was reduced to 13.

Notes

References

2009 establishments in Andalusia
2012 disestablishments in Andalusia
Cabinets established in 2009
Cabinets disestablished in 2012
Cabinets of Andalusia